Runaway is the story of a young boy who takes to the streets to get away from the torment he suffers at school and daily problems at home. Life at home is rife with daily doses of scoldings from his half-drunk mother, and his two younger brothers Dean and Jack pay him scant attention until noticing he is missing. On his journey, Sean meets a girl named Molly who takes him to a crumbling mill where her family lives. The series follows the police search for Sean, and how his disappearance affects his family.

Runaways was part of a short season on CBBC about children and homelessness, along with a 5-part documentary "Sofa Surfers". The program was first shown as three separated half-hour episodes in March 2009, and later as an 82-minute film.

Cast

Episodes

References

External links
 

2009 British television series debuts
2009 British television series endings
2000s British drama television series
2000s British television miniseries
BBC children's television shows
English-language television shows